Problepsis lucifimbria is a moth of the  family Geometridae. It is found on Sumatra.

References

Moths described in 1902
Scopulini
Moths of Indonesia